The Time, The Place was a British audience participation talk show that was produced by a number of different ITV companies, and broadcast live on ITV from 1987 to 1998. TTTP was presented by Mike Scott from 1987 to 1993 and by John Stapleton from 1991 to 1998. Henry Kelly also presented the programme for a period before Stapleton took over full time.

Format
The program was developed as ITV's competition to the BBC's Kilroy morning discussion show which premiered in 1986. It differed from Kilroy in that Kilroy delved into more political and current event related issues, while TTTP focused on human interest topics.

The programme toured the country and came from the various ITV regional studios, including Aberdeen after the Piper Alpha disaster. Towards the end of its run, the programme came from London at least three days a week to save money. It ended on 20 March 1998, to make way for the less topical, more issue-led programme Vanessa, which mainly dealt with personal matters.

References

External links
 

1987 British television series debuts
1998 British television series endings
ITV (TV network) original programming
British television talk shows
English-language television shows
Television series by ITV Studios
Television series by Fremantle (company)
Television shows produced by Television South (TVS)
Television shows produced by Central Independent Television
Television shows produced by Anglia Television
Television shows produced by Ulster Television